The Hot Laboratory and Waste Management Center (HLWMC), is dedicated for radioactive waste disposal as well as development of expertise in the back end of nuclear fuel cycle and radioisotope production for medical and industrial applications. The HLWMC was established in 1980, owned and operated by the Egyptian Atomic Energy Authority (AEA) in Inshas, northeast of Cairo.

Overview 
The Hot Laboratory and Waste Management Center (HLWMC) consists of a low and intermediate level liquid waste station, radioisotope production laboratories, and a radioactive waste disposal site. HLWMC contains a French-supplied hot cell complex for plutonium extraction research, which is the only known facility in Egypt that could be used to separate weapons-usable plutonium from irradiated reactor fuel. However, the facility does not contain nuclear materials requiring IAEA safeguards.

See also 

 Nuclear program of Egypt
 Egyptian Atomic Energy Authority
 Radioisotope Production Facility

References 

Radioactive waste
Radioactive waste repositories
Waste treatment technology
Nuclear technology in Egypt
Nuclear program of Egypt
Nuclear research institutes
1980 establishments in Egypt
Government agencies of Egypt